The Complete Beat is a 5-CD box set by British ska/new wave band The Beat (known as The English Beat in the US) released on 10 July 2012 only in the US and Canada. The box set contains The Beat's three studio albums remastered and two CDs of bonus content: the first contains extended and dub versions, and the second contains all the tracks from their three Peel Sessions and several tracks live from the Boston Opera House.

The studio albums are the US release versions, as "Tears of a Clown", "Ranking Full Stop", "Too Nice to Talk To" and "Hit It" weren't included on the original UK releases of their respective albums. Also, both Wha'ppen and Special Beat Service CDs include bonus tracks.

On the same day of release, Shout! Factory also released the single-CD compilation album Keep The Beat: The Very Best of The English Beat and a live album, Live at the US Festival, '82 & '83.

Critical reception 

AllMusic critic Stephen Thomas Erlewine gave the box set a rating of 4.5 out of 5 and said "as always, the extended mixes and dubs are something that appeals to a particular taste -- those who prefer the pop end of the Beat's equation won't find them compelling -- but their rangy, elastic reworkings underline the adventure and excitement at the core of the Beat. They grew up strong and they grew up fast, so fast that their recordings retain a visceral force that makes The Complete Beat something more than a dream come true for fans: it is a convincing argument for their greatness."

The review aggregator Metacritic has it at a score of 90/100 based on 8 critic reviews. Ray Sidman for Goldmine gave it a 4/5, saying that "there are a few songs in the bunch that are subpar or worse, as would be expected of any performer, but overall, The English Beat built a solid New Wave oeuvre". "The set’s packaging is simple but attractive and sturdy" with a "well-written, 24-page booklet by Alex Ogg that provides a history of band"and "though there are no previously unreleased songs here, many of the rarities are receiving a CD release for the first time with this set".

Reviewing for Rolling Stone magazine, Jody Rosen gave the box set 4.5/5 and said that it "features the band's three great studio albums, plus terrific bonus tracks and dub versions, and a slew of live recordings in which the Beat unleash their dance-floor fury and their Thatcher-era protest politics." Stephen Deusner for Paste magazine gave the box set 9.1/10 and concluded that the live tracks are the "most compelling, if only because it takes them out of the relatively hermetic environment of the studio and puts them in front of an audience. The Complete Beat argues that the band made solid albums as full statements, but this handful of tracks—especially “Tears of a Clown” and “Get-A-Job/Stand Down Margaret”—show them in their natural setting."

Track listing

References 

The Beat (British band) albums
2012 compilation albums
Shout! Factory compilation albums
Albums produced by Bob Sargeant
Albums produced by Mike Hedges